James Clarence Harrell, Jr. (born July 19, 1957) is an American former college and professional football player who was a linebacker in the National Football League (NFL) and the United States Football League (USFL) for nine seasons during the 1970s and 1980s.  He played college football for the University of Florida, and thereafter, he played professionally for the Detroit Lions and Kansas City Chiefs of the NFL and the Tampa Bay Bandits of the USFL.

Early years 

Harrell was born in Tampa, Florida in 1957.  He attended Chamberlain High School in Tampa, and he played high school football for the Chamberlain Chiefs.

College career 

Harrell turned down athletic scholarships from smaller colleges; he wanted to play for a major college football program.  He attended the University of Florida in Gainesville, Florida, where he played for coach Doug Dickey's Florida Gators football team from 1975 to 1978.  He was a walk-on who wanted to play linebacker, but Dickey discouraged it and said that the Gators needed more depth at strong safety, so Harrell set out to learn a position he had never played.  He played for the Gators freshman team, and earned a scholarship at the end of his first season.  When he returned for his second season he had beefed up from 185 pounds to 220, and Dickey asked him to move to defensive end.  Still, he was not a starter, but he became a serious student and threw himself into his special teams play.  As a senior in 1978, he finally became a principal back-up and saw significant game time.

Harrell returned to Gainesville during the NFL off-season and completed his bachelor's degree in public relations in 1984.

Professional career 

The Denver Broncos signed Harrell as an undrafted free agent in May 1979, but waived him before the start of the  season. He also played for the USFL's Tampa Bay Bandits from 1984 to 1985. During his two USFL seasons with the Bandits, he compiled three interceptions and 5.5 quarterback sacks.

During his eight NFL seasons, Harrell appeared in eighty-nine games and started thirty-two of them.

Life after the NFL 

In 2005, Harrell became the co-defensive coordinator for the Plant Panthers of Plant High School in Tampa, and in the next four years the Panthers won two Florida Class 4A state championships.  In February 2009, Harrell became the head coach of the Freedom Patriots of Freedom High School in Tampa, and, in 2010, he accepted an offer to be the head coach of the Tampa Jesuit Tigers of Jesuit High School, a private Catholic preparatory school in Tampa.  Harrell was previously an assistant coach at Jesuit for eleven seasons from 1994 to 2004.

See also 

 Florida Gators football, 1970–79
 List of Detroit Lions players
 List of Florida Gators in the NFL Draft
 List of University of Florida alumni

References

Bibliography
 Carlson, Norm, University of Florida Football Vault: The History of the Florida Gators, Whitman Publishing, LLC, Atlanta, Georgia (2007).  .
 Golenbock, Peter, Go Gators!  An Oral History of Florida's Pursuit of Gridiron Glory, Legends Publishing, LLC, St. Petersburg, Florida (2002).  .
 Hairston, Jack, Tales from the Gator Swamp: A Collection of the Greatest Gator Stories Ever Told, Sports Publishing, LLC, Champaign, Illinois (2002).  .
 McCarthy, Kevin M.,  Fightin' Gators: A History of University of Florida Football, Arcadia Publishing, Mount Pleasant, South Carolina (2000).  .
 Nash, Noel, ed., The Gainesville Sun Presents The Greatest Moments in Florida Gators Football, Sports Publishing, Inc., Champaign, Illinois (1998).  .

1957 births
Living people
American football linebackers
Detroit Lions players
Florida Gators football players
George D. Chamberlain High School alumni
High school football coaches in Florida
Kansas City Chiefs players
Players of American football from Tampa, Florida
Tampa Bay Bandits players